Sir Philip Antony Fyson Buck  (19 December 1928 – 6 October 2003) was a British Conservative politician.

Early life and career
The son of Arthur F. Buck, a farmer and agricultural merchant, and his wife Laura (née Fyson), a founder member of the Royal College of Nursing, Buck was born in Cambridge, Cambridgeshire. He was educated at The King's School, Ely and Trinity Hall, Cambridge, where he studied Law and History and was the chairman of the Cambridge University Conservative Association as the successor to Geoffrey Howe. He then trained as a barrister and was called to the bar by the Inner Temple in 1954, becoming a prominent criminal lawyer and a Queen's Counsel in 1974.

Political career
He was elected MP for Colchester in a 1961 by-election. A strong supporter of the modernising Conservatism championed by Edward Heath, Buck served as the Under-Secretary for Defence from 1972 to 1974 with responsibility for the Royal Navy, but his fortunes declined when Heath lost the election in 1974, and he managed the unsuccessful leadership campaign for his old friend Geoffrey Howe. Buck then lost his place on the executive of the 1922 Committee, although he later regained it. Nevertheless, he remained a perceptive observer of defence policy, opposing the closure of Colchester's military hospital and other cuts. He was also chairman of the Parliamentary Ombudsman Committee. He was held in high regard by his constituency party and continued to serve as the MP for Colchester until 1983 when he became MP for Colchester North after boundary changes.  He retired from parliament in 1992.

Marriages
Buck married three times. His daughter Louisa, from his 34-year first marriage to Judy Grant, is an art critic. In 1994, tabloid newspaper reports of a relationship between his second wife,  and Air Chief Marshal Sir Peter Harding, were followed by Harding's resignation as Chief of the Defence Staff. His third wife was Russia-born Tamara Norashkaryan.

References

External links
 

 
 

 
 
 

1928 births
2003 deaths
People from Cambridge
Knights Bachelor
Conservative Party (UK) MPs for English constituencies
UK MPs 1959–1964
UK MPs 1964–1966
UK MPs 1966–1970
UK MPs 1970–1974
UK MPs 1974
UK MPs 1974–1979
UK MPs 1979–1983
UK MPs 1983–1987
UK MPs 1987–1992
20th-century King's Counsel
Members of the Inner Temple
Politics of Colchester
People educated at King's Ely
Alumni of Trinity Hall, Cambridge
Politicians awarded knighthoods